Robert Louis August Maximilian Gürke (17 November 1854, in Beuthen, now Bytom Odrzański – 16 March 1911, in Berlin) was a German botanist. He usually appears in literature as Max Gürke (older English-language publications sometimes give the name as "Guerke").

Selected publications
 Plantae Europeae, with Karl Richter (1890–1903).

References

External links 
 Extensive bibliography at WorldCat
 Verhandlungen des Botanischen Vereins der Provinz Brandenburg, 1911 - long obituary

1854 births
1911 deaths
People from the Province of Silesia
Botanists with author abbreviations
19th-century German botanists
People from Nowa Sól County